Wyatt 'Bunty'  Thompson (20 April 1925 – 15 December 2017) was an Australian equestrian rider who competed in the 1956 Summer Olympics in Stockholm, Sweden. In 2012, he was inducted into  Equestrian Australia's Hall of Fame with teammates Brian Crago, Ern Barker, David Wood, Franz Mairinger and Alec Creswick, who were members of Australia's first Olympic equestrian team.

References

1925 births
2017 deaths
Australian male equestrians
Olympic equestrians of Australia
Equestrians at the 1956 Summer Olympics
20th-century Australian people